Pandu Vassu Naik (31 August 1940 – 2 August 2016) was an Indian politician, businessperson and social worker from Goa. He was a former member of the Goa Legislative Assembly, representing the Sanguem Assembly constituency from 1984 to 1989 and 1994 to 1999.

Early and personal life
Pandu Vassu Naik was born at Benwado, Sanguem. He completed his formal education. He was married to Kishori Naik, the couple has two sons and a daughter. Naik loved participating in dramas and reading. He had a special interest to be part of the politics. He also practiced social work and resided at Bazarwada, Sanguem.

Death
On 1 August 2016 at 2:45 pm IST, Naik died from a brief illness, aged 75. His last rites were held the next day at 10:00 pm IST.

Positions held
 Director of Goa State Co-operative Bank Ltd.
 Member of State Transport Authority
 Member of Public Undertakings Committee 1995–96
 Chairman of Library Committee 1995–96
 Member of Estimates Committee 1995–96
 Member of Government Assurances Committee 1995–96
 Former Chairman of Goa Housing Board

References

1940 births
2016 deaths
Indian politicians
Goa MLAs 1984–1989
People from South Goa district
Goan people
Goa MLAs 1994–1999
Former members of Indian National Congress from Goa